Get Going is a 1943 American comedy film directed by Jean Yarbrough and written by Warren Wilson. The film stars Robert Paige, Grace McDonald, Barbara Jo Allen, Walter Catlett, Maureen Cannon, Lois Collier and Milburn Stone. The film was released on June 21, 1943, by Universal Pictures.

Plot

Cast        
Robert Paige as Bob Carlton
Grace McDonald as Judy King
Barbara Jo Allen as Matilda Jones 
Walter Catlett as Horace Doblem
Maureen Cannon as Bonnie
Lois Collier as Doris
Milburn Stone as Mr. Tuttle
Frank Faylen as Hank Andrews
Jennifer Holt as Vilma Walters
Nana Bryant as Mrs. Daughtery
Claire Whitney as Secretary

References

External links
 

1943 films
1940s English-language films
American comedy films
1943 comedy films
Universal Pictures films
Films directed by Jean Yarbrough
American black-and-white films
1940s American films